Dorota Bucław (born 16 October 1977) is a Polish para table tennis player who competes at international table tennis competitions. She is a World bronze medalist and a European champion, she has also competed at the 2012 and 2016 Summer Paralympics and has been selected to compete at the 2020 Summer Paralympics.

In 1994, Bucław was playing basketball with a friend and her friend pressed her body against a wall, she pulled her neck which caused nerve damage and has affected the use of her right hand. Five years later, she broke her neck following an accident at a level crossing.

References

1977 births
Living people
Sportspeople from Bydgoszcz
Paralympic table tennis players of Poland
Polish female table tennis players
Table tennis players at the 2012 Summer Paralympics
Table tennis players at the 2016 Summer Paralympics
Table tennis players at the 2020 Summer Paralympics